Anca Damian is a Romanian film director, writer, and producer.

She has directed the film Marona's Fantastic Tale (originally, "L'extraordinaire voyage de Marona")., released in 2019.

Damian has also directed the film Moon Hotel Kabul, for which she won the Best Director award at Warsaw International Film Festival.

She also has an upcoming project involving the topic of albinism, titled Starseed

Partial filmography

Feature films
Marona's Fantastic Tale (2019)
Moon Hotel Kabul (2018)
The Magic Mountain (2015)
''Crulic: The Path to Beyond (2011)

External links

References

Living people
Romanian film directors
Romanian women film directors
Year of birth missing (living people)